The following lists events that happened during 2011 in Malawi.

Incumbents
 President: Bingu wa Mutharika 
 Vice-President: Joyce Banda

Events

July
July 20 - Riots erupt in the country against the president Bingu wa Mutharika.
July 21 - At least 18 people are killed in the protests as the army is called in to crush them in the capital of Lilongwe.
July 22 - Authorities block a mass funeral for seven of the people who died in the protests.

References

 
Malawi
Years of the 21st century in Malawi
2010s in Malawi
Malawi